Sir Ketumile Masire Teaching Hospital (SKMTH) is the first Quaternary teaching hospital established to fill identified gaps in the healthcare industry in Botswana. Incorporated as a company limited by guarantee and wholly owned by the Government of Botswana, it is licensed to operate as a private hospital. The hospital is 100% owned by the Government of Botswana."

SKMTH‘s mandate is threefold:

• To deliver patient-centred care for specialized healthcare services, at the Quaternary level

• To teach and facilitate the development of healthcare professionals.

• To invest in and create a conducive environment for medical research.

Vision:  To be the industry standard of excellence in the provision of healthcare services, research and teaching to improve health outcomes.

Mission: To deliver the highest quality of specialized healthcare services and provide a cooperative platform for teaching and research in line with both national and global health priorities

Location
The school is located on the main campus of the University of Botswana, in the central business district of Gaborone, the largest city and capital of Botswana. The coordinates Sir Ketumile Masire Teaching Hospital are: 24°39'52.0"S, 25°55'49.0"E (Latitude:-24.664444; Longitude:25.930278).

Clinical Services
SKMTH has the following Medical Services:

 Medical Services
 Medical Specialities and Subspecialties
 Surgical Specialities and Subspecialties
 Paediatrics Services
 Obstetrics and Gynaecology
 Intensive Care Service
Emergency Medicine
Anaesthesiology
Rehabilitation Services
Nuclear Medicine
Diagnostic and Interventional Radiology
Medical and Radiation Oncology
Allied Health Services

In addition to the listed medical services, Allied Health Services will also be provided, including Physiotherapy, Occupational Therapy, Nutrition and Dietetics, Speech and Language Therapy, Audiology, Clinical Psychology, Social Work, Radiography, Prosthetics and Orthotics, Medical Health Information, Optometry, and Medical Laboratory.

The hospital aims to become a leading center for certain services in the long term, including Comprehensive Cancer Care, Critical Care, Cardiovascular, Trauma and Burns, Renal and Organ Transplant, and Ophthalmology.

Partnerships 
The Hospital maintains a partnership with the University of Botswana.

See also
 Education in Botswana
 Medical education

References

External links
 Website of the University of Botswana
 htthttps://www.moh.gov.bw/hospitals1.html

University of Botswana
2009 establishments in Botswana
Educational institutions established in 2009
Medical schools in Botswana
Teaching hospitals